The Women's National Health Association (WNHA) was a body set up in Ireland in 1907 with the objective of eliminating, as far as possible, the scourge of tuberculosis, and to bring about a reduction in the high infant mortality rates in Ireland.

Founding
The association was founded by Lady Aberdeen, wife of the Lord-Lieutenant in Ireland, Lord Aberdeen. During their second term in Ireland, from 1906 to 1915, Lady Aberdeen focused on healthcare and social well-being, subjects she had been interested in all her life.
Over 170 local branches of the WNHA were formed throughout the country, initially on a County basis, and subsequently sub branches were set up in each county.

Activities
The work of the association began with an exhibition on health matters, which was part of the Irish International Exhibition held in Dublin in 1907. With government help, the Association established pasteurized milk depots, built hospitals, dispensaries and sanitariums and expanded its activities to include medical and dental inspections for school children.

In 1908, Lady Aberdeen edited a three-volume work entitled Ireland’s Crusade Against Tuberculosis, which was a
summary of the lectures given at the first of the WNHA Health Exhibitions. She also edited Sláinte, the journal of the WNHA from 1909 to 1915.

Evolution of the association
After the arrival of the first casualties of the Great war back in Ireland, the personnel of the WHNA progressively evolved into the Red Cross and attended to the war casualties at home, founding hospitals and nursing homes.

Notable members
 Mary Fleetwood Berry
 Florence Moon
 Angela Russell
 Edith Young
Nina Kilkelly,
Isabel Lefroy,
Marie Benner,
Ethel Bond,
Mary Bond,
Julia Delany,
Beatrice King-Harman,
Lady Granard.

See also 
 Feminism in Ireland

References

Organizations established in 1907
Tuberculosis organizations
Medical and health organisations based in the United Kingdom
Medical and health organisations based in the Republic of Ireland
Women's organisations based in Ireland